Rasmaadhoo(Dhivehi: ރަސްމާދޫ) is one of the inhabited islands in Raa Atoll Maldives.

Geography

Demography
It has a population of 825. Most of the islanders have migrated to the Capital City Male.

Governance
The president of the council is Mohamed Asif, who is elected as an Independent member. Other members of the island council include Muruthalo Rasheed (PPM) Abdhul Hameed Hassan (PPM) Aminath Firasha (MDP) Samla Easa (PPM).

Economy
Most men of Rasmaadhoo are fishermen.

Culture and sport
Rasmaadhoo is famous for Boduberu and surfing.

References

Islands of the Maldives